Manataria hercyna, the white-spotted satyr, is the only member of the genus Manataria from the subfamily Satyrinae in the family Nymphalidae. It is found in the Neotropical zone.

Subspecies
M. h. hercyna - (Brazil, Peru)
M. h. maculata (Hopffer, 1874) - (Costa Rica, Mexico)
M. h. hyrnethia Fruhstorfer, 1912 - (Bolivia, Peru, Ecuador, Colombia)
M. h. distincta (Lathy, 1918) - (French Guiana)
M. h. daguana (Neustetter, 1929) - (Colombia)

References

Butterflies described in 1821
Melanitini
Fauna of Brazil
Nymphalidae of South America